Goran Rakočević (born March 1, 1951), is a former Serbian professional basketball player. He is the father of Igor Rakočević, a Serbian professional basketball executive and former player.

Playing career 
Rakočević spent entire playing career in Crvena zvezda of the Yugoslav Basketball League, where he played during 1970s. His teammates were Zoran Slavnić, Dragan Kapičić, Ljubodrag Simonović, Dragiša Vučinić and Vladimir Cvetković among others. With them he won the National Championships, three National Cups and the 1974 FIBA European Cup Winners' Cup (nowadays Saporta Cup).

National team  career 
Rakočević was a member of the Yugoslavian national team that won the gold medal at the 1975 Mediterranean Games in Algeria. During his career he played 17 games for the national team.

Career achievements 
 FIBA European Cup Winners' Cup winner: 1 (with Crvena zvezda: 1973–74).
 Yugoslav League champion: 1 (with Crvena zvezda: 1971–72).
 Yugoslav Cup winner: 3 (with Crvena zvezda: 1970–71, 1972–73, 1974–75).

Personal life 
He married Vesna Strahinjić and they have a son and a daughter. His son Igor (born 1978) is a former professional basketball player who started his career in Crvena zvezda, also. Igor is a two-time All-Euroleague Team member and three-time Alphonso Ford Trophy winner and won 2002 FIBA World Championship and 2001 EuroBasket representing FR Yugoslavia national team.

See also
 List of father-and-son combinations who have played for Crvena zvezda
 List of KK Crvena zvezda players with 100 games played

References

1951 births
Living people
Basketball players from Belgrade
Competitors at the 1975 Mediterranean Games
KK Crvena zvezda players
Mediterranean Games gold medalists for Yugoslavia
Serbian men's basketball players
Yugoslav men's basketball players
Mediterranean Games medalists in basketball
Point guards